The Sinan solar power plant is a 24 MW  photovoltaic power station in Sinan, Jeollanam-do, South Korea. , it is the largest photovoltaic installation in Asia.  The project was developed by the German company Conergy and it cost US$150 million.  It was built by the Dongyang Engineering & Construction Corporation.

See also

Photovoltaic power stations

References

Photovoltaic power stations in South Korea